The 2005 Asian Women's Youth Handball Championship (1st tournament) took place in Bangkok from 26 June–1 July. It acts as the Asian qualifying tournament for the 2006 Women's Youth World Handball Championship in Canada.

Results

Final standing

References
www.handball.jp(  2009-09-04)

External links
www.asianhandball.com

International handball competitions hosted by Thailand
Asian Women's Youth Handball Championship, 2005
Asia
Asian Handball Championships